is a passenger railway station in the city of Kiryū, Gunma, Japan, operated by the third sector railway company Watarase Keikoku Railway.

Lines

Station layout
The station consists of a single side platform serving traffic in both directions. There is no station building, but only an open-sided shelter on the platform itself. The station is unattended.

History
Motojuku Station opened on 29 March 1989.

Passenger statistics
In fiscal 2019, the station was used by an average of 24 passengers daily (boarding passengers only).

Surrounding area
 Nashiki onsen

See also
 List of railway stations in Japan

References

External links

  Station information (Watarase Keikoku) 

Railway stations in Gunma Prefecture
Railway stations in Japan opened in 1989
Kiryū, Gunma